is a passenger railway station located in the city of Fujisawa, Kanagawa, Japan and operated by the private railway operator Odakyu Electric Railway.

Lines
It is 59.9 kilometers from the Tokyo terminus of Odakyu at Shinjuku Station. It is also within walking distance of Enoshima Station on the Enoshima Electric Railway (Enoden) and Shonan-Enoshima Station on the Shonan Monorail.

Station layout
Katase-Enoshima Station has two bay platforms serving three tracks, which are connected to the station building by a footbridge. The station building is designed to evoke the image of Ryūgū-jō, or Dragon Palace, the underwater dwelling in the Urashima Taro fable.

Platforms

History
Katase-Enoshima Station opened on April 1, 1929.

Work commenced in February 2018 to rebuild and modernize the station, and was completed at the end of July 2020.

Passenger statistics
In fiscal 2019, the station was used by an average of 19,828 passengers daily.

The passenger figures for previous years are as shown below.

Surrounding area
  Enoshima Station (Enoshima Electric Railway)
  Shonan-Enoshima Station (Shonan Monorail)
 Enoshima

See also
 List of railway stations in Japan

References

External links

 

Railway stations in Kanagawa Prefecture
Railway stations in Japan opened in 1929
Odakyū Enoshima Line
Railway stations in Fujisawa, Kanagawa